Ryan Kreidler (born November 12, 1997) is an American professional baseball shortstop with the Detroit Tigers of Major League Baseball (MLB).

Amateur career
Kreidler attended Davis High School in Davis, California. He was drafted by the Chicago Cubs in the 35th round of the 2016 Major League Baseball draft but did not sign and played college baseball at the University of California, Los Angeles (UCLA). In 2018, he played collegiate summer baseball with the Wareham Gatemen of the Cape Cod Baseball League. He was drafted by the Detroit Tigers in the fourth round of the 2019 MLB draft and signed.

Professional career
Kreidler made his professional debut with the Connecticut Tigers, batting .232 with two home runs and twenty RBIs over sixty games. He did not play a minor league game in 2020 due to the season being cancelled because of the COVID-19 pandemic. He started 2021 with the Erie SeaWolves before being promoted to the Toledo Mud Hens. Over 129 games between the two teams, he slashed .270/.349/.454 with 22 home runs, 58 RBIs, and 15 stolen bases.

On September 1, 2022, Kreidler's contract was selected from Triple-A. He recorded his first major league hit, a single, on September 3 against the Kansas City Royals. Kreidler's first major league home run on September 7 was a game-winner, struck in the top of the ninth inning off José Quijada of the Los Angeles Angels to break a 4–4 tie.

References

External links

1997 births
Living people
Baseball players from California
Connecticut Tigers players
Detroit Tigers players
Erie SeaWolves players
Major League Baseball shortstops
Mankato MoonDogs players
People from Davis, California
Salt River Rafters players
Toledo Mud Hens players
UCLA Bruins baseball players
Wareham Gatemen players
West Michigan Whitecaps players